Meliscaeva  is a genus of hoverflies.

They have bare eyes, bare metasternum, bare metapisternum, the anterior anepisternum is usually pilose. Wing margin with a series of minute closely spaced black maculae on posterior margin.

Mostly Oriental, however, Meliscaeva cinctella is widely distributed in North America and Europe.

Species
M. abdominalis (Sack, 1927)
M. auricollis (Meigen, 822 )
M. ceylonica (Keiser, 1958)
M. cinctella (Zetterstedt, 1843)
M. cinctelloides Ghorpade, 1994
M. darjeelingensis Datta & Chakraborti, 1986
M. deceptor (Curran, 1928)
M. ichthyops (Meijere, 1914)
M. kusuma Ghorpade, 1994
M. latifasciata Huo, Ren & Zheng, 2007
M. lefroyi Ghorpade, 1994
M. magnifica Ghorpade, 1994
M. malaisei Ghorpade, 1994
M. malayensis (Curran, 1928)
M. mathisi Ghorpade, 1994
M. melanostomoides (Hull, 1941)
M. monticola (Meijere, 1914)
M. morna (Curran, 1931)
M. nigripes (Meijere, 1914)
M. omogensis (Shiraki & Edashige, 1953)
M. peteus (Curran, 1931)
M. sonami (Shiraki, 1930)
M. splendida Huo, Ren & Zheng, 2007
M. strigifrons (Meijere, 1914)
M. taiwana (Shiraki, 1930)
M. tenuiformis (Curran, 1928)
M. tribeni (Nayar, 1968)

References

Links
Encyclopedia of Life

Hoverfly genera
Diptera of Europe
Diptera of North America
Syrphinae
Syrphini